Astrakhanovka may refer to:
Astraxanovka, Azerbaijan,  a village and municipality in the Oghuz Rayon
Astrakhanovka, Azerbaijan, a village in the Jalilabad Rayon
Astrakhanovka, name of several rural localities in Russia

See also
Astrakhan (disambiguation)
Astrakhanka (disambiguation)